Trinity Church, also known as Old Swedes' Church, is a historic church on the northwest corner of Church Street and King's Highway in Swedesboro in Gloucester County, New Jersey.

The congregation was founded as a Swedish Lutheran parish in 1703, after local residents tired of crossing the Delaware River or Philadelphia to worship. The first minister, Lars Tollstadius, arrived in the area in 1701. The church was the first Swedish congregation in New Jersey and originally it worshiped in a log building.  Services were held in Swedish until 1784. The building was added to the National Register of Historic Places in 1973 for its significance in architecture and religion.

History
In 1641, Peter Hollander Ridder, the second governor of New Sweden purchased from local Indians the entire eastern side of the Delaware River extending from Raccoon Creek to Cape May. The first settlement by the Swedes was on the banks of Raccoon Creek,  originally named Raccoon and later Swedesboro.

To attend church, the Swedish settlers in Raccoon had to cross the river to Wilmington or Philadelphia. The difficulty of this crossing led to the decision to build a new church on the banks of Raccoon Creek. The site selected was near the new bridge for Kings Highway, which led from Burlington to Salem. In 1703,  they purchased  along the Raccoon Creek and on part of it established their own church, the first Swedish language church in New Jersey.

Trinity Church was originally a Swedish Lutheran Parish. From 1703 to 1786, it was served by clergy sent from Sweden.  With the completion of a new church building in 1786, the Swedish Mission was drawing to a close. The Swedish language was almost extinct and the people no longer felt the same bond of sympathy with the land of their forebears. The congregations in New Jersey did not desire new pastors from Sweden and could not afford to offer them decent support. In October 1789 a semblance of affiliation by Trinity Church with the Episcopal Church in America began. The church is now known as Trinity Episcopal "Old Swedes" Church and is a member parish of the Episcopal Diocese of New Jersey.

Cemetery
Trinity Church Cemetery (also known as Trinity Episcopal "Old Swedes" Church Cemetery) is located behind Trinity Church.

Notable interments
 Louis H. Carpenter (February 11, 1839 – January 21, 1916) – Indian Wars Congressional Medal of Honor recipient and Spanish–American War General.
 Charles Garrison Harker (December 2, 1835 – June 27, 1864) – American Civil War Brigadier General in the Union Army.
 Benjamin Franklin Howey (March 17, 1828 – February 6, 1895) – Republican Congressman to the Forty-eighth United States Congress (1883–1885).
 Charles Creighton Stratton (March 6, 1796 – March 30, 1859) – Served in the United States House of Representatives and was later the 15th Governor of New Jersey.

See also
National Register of Historic Places listings in Gloucester County, New Jersey
Churchtown, New Jersey, site of Penns Neck church

References

External links

 
Official Church Website

Episcopal church buildings in New Jersey
Churches on the National Register of Historic Places in New Jersey
Georgian architecture in New Jersey
Federal architecture in New Jersey
Churches completed in 1786
Churches in Gloucester County, New Jersey
18th-century Episcopal church buildings
National Register of Historic Places in Gloucester County, New Jersey
New Jersey Register of Historic Places
Historic American Buildings Survey in New Jersey
Swedesboro, New Jersey
Swedish-American history
Finnish-American history
Swedish American culture in New Jersey
Finnish-American culture in New Jersey
New Sweden
Churches in New Sweden